Darryl Bernard Conrad (born ) is a Canadian male weightlifter and former Canadian football player, competing in the 77-85 kg category and representing Canada at international competitions. He participated at the 2014 Commonwealth Games in the 85 kg event, and at the 2015 Pan American Games in the 77 kg event. He played university football for Manitoba and was subsequently drafted in 2007 CFL Draft by the Montreal Alouettes but did not play for them and instead played one season professionally for the Winnepeg Blue Bombers.

Major competitions

References

1984 births
Living people
Canadian male weightlifters
Place of birth missing (living people)
Weightlifters at the 2014 Commonwealth Games
Commonwealth Games competitors for Canada
Weightlifters at the 2015 Pan American Games
Pan American Games competitors for Canada
20th-century Canadian people
21st-century Canadian people